Willful Murder is a 1981 Japanese drama film directed by Kei Kumai. It was entered into the 32nd Berlin International Film Festival.

Cast
 Tatsuya Nakadai
 Kei Yamamoto
 Yōko Asaji
 Kaneko Iwasaki
 Ichirō Nakatani
 Junkichi Orimoto
 Daisuke Ryū
 Kōji Yakusho

References

External links

1981 films
1980s mystery drama films
1981 crime drama films
1980s Japanese-language films
Japanese mystery drama films
Japanese crime drama films
Crime films based on actual events
Films about miscarriage of justice
Films directed by Kei Kumai
1980s Japanese films